George Richard "Reg" Gregory (1 February 1892 – 17 August 1970) was a New Zealand cricketer. He played in sixteen first-class matches for Canterbury from 1922 to 1929.

Gregory was a solid opening batsman. He had his best Plunket Shield season in 1927–28, when he was Canterbury's leading scorer, with 247 runs at an average of 41.16, including his highest first-class score of 67 against Auckland, when Canterbury won by 11 runs. He was the highest scorer in Christchurch senior club cricket in 1926–27, with 806 runs at an average of 62.00.

For many years he managed Quill Morris liquor merchants in Christchurch.

See also
 List of Canterbury representative cricketers

References

External links
 

1892 births
1970 deaths
New Zealand cricketers
Canterbury cricketers
People from Madeley, Shropshire